John "Johnny" Lindsay or John Lindsey (born August 23, 1894 – July 3, 1950) was an American jazz double-bassist and trombonist, active in the New Orleans and Chicago jazz scenes.

Career 
Lindsay learned both instruments while young and played trombone in a military band and in ensembles late in the 1910s. In New Orleans, he played with John Robichaux and Armand J. Piron's Olympia Orchestra; Lindsay was Piron's trombonist on recordings made in New York City in 1923 and 1924. He was in Dewey Jackson's riverboat band in 1924, then relocated to Chicago, where he played with Willie Hightower, Carroll Dickerson, Lil Hardin, and Jelly Roll Morton's Red Hot Peppers. Most of his playing in Chicago and subsequently was on bass rather than trombone. Later in his career he toured nationally with Louis Armstrong (1931–32), Richard M. Jones, Jimmie Noone, Punch Miller, Johnny Dodds, Chippie Hill, Georgia White, Harlem Hamfats, and Baby Dodds.

References
Footnotes

General references
Alyn Shipton, "John Lindsay". The New Grove Dictionary of Jazz. 2nd edition, ed. Barry Kernfeld.

External links
 John Lindsay recordings at the Discography of American Historical Recordings.

American jazz double-bassists
Male double-bassists
American jazz trombonists
Male trombonists
Jazz musicians from New Orleans
1894 births
1950 deaths
20th-century double-bassists
20th-century trombonists
20th-century American male musicians
American male jazz musicians
Olympia Orchestra members
Red Hot Peppers members